Wild Horse is an unincorporated village in Cheyenne County, Colorado, United States.  The community takes its name from Wild Horse Creek, and began in 1869 as a cavalry outpost, which soon became a railway station and had expanded to a town by the mid-1870s.  After a peak of population and business activities in the early 1900s, the town began dwindling by 1917, when most of it burned down in a great fire.  The town rebuilt, but never at the population or business-service centralization level of its earlier years, and by the 1930s, had begun to dwindle further.

There is still a post office at Wild Horse, which has been in operation since 1904. and currently services ZIP Code 80862. There is also a one-room school house, no longer in use, and a cluster of older small homes.

Geography
Wild Horse is located at  (38.825533,-103.011761).

Popular culture
Wild Horse is the home of the United States Space Force in the Netflix comedy series Space Force, although the series was not actually filmed in the village.

References

Unincorporated communities in Cheyenne County, Colorado
Unincorporated communities in Colorado